Ken Henry may refer to:

Ken Henry (public servant) (born 1957), Australian economist and public servant, Secretary of the Department of the Treasury, 2001–2011
Ken Henry (speed skater) (1929–2009), American Olympic speed skater
Kenneth Henry (judge), Bahamian judge, President of the Court of Appeal from 1987 to 1992